Tosnensky (masculine), Tosnenskaya (feminine), or Tosnenskoye (neuter) may refer to:
Tosnensky District, a district of Leningrad Oblast, Russia
Tosnenskoye Urban Settlement, a municipal formation corresponding to Tosnenskoye Settlement Municipal Formation, an administrative division of Tosnensky District of Leningrad Oblast, Russia